Greenwood Lake is a village in Orange County, New York, United States, in the southern part of the town of Warwick. As of the 2020 census, the population of the village was 2,994. It is part of the Poughkeepsie–Newburgh–Middletown, NY Metropolitan Statistical Area as well as the larger New York–Newark–Bridgeport Combined Statistical Area.

History
Greenwood Lake was settled by Europeans as a farming community in the 1700s in the area of an earlier village occupied by the Munsee Indians.  The Munsees, considered a branch of the Lenape people (also known as the Delaware), were Algonquian speakers who called the lake Quampium.

Some of the farms at the head of the lake were purchased by the Morris Canal and Banking Company in 1837, and  portions of these properties were inundated after a dam was built that same year. It greatly increased the size of the lake to its current condition.  The enlarged lake attracted tourists, and a grand hotel operated by Theron Felter was operating within the area of the village by at least 1851. The development of the village dates to 1856, when most of the available land was purchased by Solomon Caldwell. He divided the land for sale as “hotels, villa sites and town lots.”  Subsequent plot plans suggested renaming the community the “town of Avington” in 1884, and “Montelac Park” in 1890, but it remained Greenwood Lake, becoming incorporated as a village in 1924.  In the ensuing years many prominent people, such as baseball star Babe Ruth and actress Greta Garbo, regularly visited the resort. Author and composer Satella Waterstone was born in Greenwood Lake in 1875.

In July 2011, director Rob Reiner's movie, "The Magic of Belle Isle" starred Morgan Freeman, Virginia Madsen and Kenan Thompson. The movie was shot entirely in Greenwood Lake.

Geography

The village is at the northern end of a lake called Greenwood Lake, which straddles the New York State and New Jersey border.  The lake is seven miles long.

The northern junction of NY-210 (Jersey Avenue/Windemere Avenue) is at NY-17A in the village.

Demographics

As of the census of 2020, there were 2,944 people and 1,238 households in the village. The population density was 1,482 people per square mile (571/km2). There were 1,534 housing units at an average density of 750.1 per square mile (290.3/km2). The racial makeup of the village was 95.57% white, 0.76% African American, 0.26% Native American, 0.85% Asian, 0.03% Pacific Islander, 0.82% from other races, and 1.70% from two or more races. Hispanic or Latino of any race were 5.04% of the population.

There were 1,332 households, out of which 34.4% had children under the age of 18 living with them, 50.7% were married couples living together, 11.1% had a female householder with no husband present, and 34.1% were non-families. 26.7% of all households were made up of individuals, and 7.6% had someone living alone who was 65 years of age or older. The average household size was 2 and the average family size was 3.

In the village, the population was spread out, with 26.6% under the age of 18, 6.0% from 18 to 24, 34.2% from 25 to 44, 22.8% from 45 to 64, and 10.4% who were 65 years of age or older. The median age was 37 years. For every 100 females, there were 101.7 males. For every 100 females age 18 and over, there were 97.1 males.

The median income for a household in the village was $80,805, and the median income for a family was $110,665. Males had a median income of $46,655 versus $37,328 for females. The per capita income for the village was $23,454. About 4.0% of families and 7.0% of the population were below the poverty line, including 6.3% of those under age 18 and 7.5% of those age 65 or over.

Greenwood Lake has a elementary and a middle school.

Notable residents include artist Nicola Saffren and her dog Smiley Wiley.

References 

 Town featured in the film, "Final Destination 2" .

External links
 Village site

Sources
 "History of Greenwood Lake," Steve Gross
 United States Census, Greenwood Lake village, New York profile

Villages in New York (state)
Villages in Orange County, New York
Populated places established in 1924
Warwick, New York
Poughkeepsie–Newburgh–Middletown metropolitan area